Process management may refer to:

 Business process management
 Business Process Management Journal
 Dynamic business process management
 International Conference on Business Process Management
 Social business process management
 Management process
 Manufacturing process management
 Process-based management
 Process management (computing)
 Distributed operating system#Process management
 Process management (Project Management)
 Process safety management
 Value process management

See also 
 Information Processing and Management